Sun Wenguang (born August 26, 1934) is an activist and vocal critic of Chinese government. He was a professor of Physics at Shandong University in Jinan from 1982 until 1994 when he retired.

Early life
Sun Wenguang was born in Rongcheng City on August 26, 1934. His father was a naval officer of the National Government. Sun joined the Navy in his early years.

Career
He was a professor of Physics at Shandong University in Jinan from 1982 until 1994 when he retired.

Activism
Sun has a history of criticizing the Chinese government, being one of the original signatories of Charter 08 and has been harassed for relations with critics of Communist China.

On April 5, 2009, Sun and a university student left to go to a local cemetery called Heroes’ Mountain (Yingxiong Shan; 英雄山) on a holiday to honor the dead. He was to visit the grave of Zhao Ziyang, a former Chinese Premier and Communist Party general secretary who died in 2005. When Sun entered the cemetery in Jinan, four or five men attacked him and beat him severely. He was admitted shortly after to Jinan hospital with three broken ribs and injuries to his spine, head, back, arms and legs. Later in 2010, Sun's passport application was rejected shortly before the Nobel Peace Prize ceremony for Liu Xiaobo.

On August 1, 2018, Sun was giving an interview with Voice of America in which he expressed opinions about Chinese Communist Party general secretary Xi Jinping and government expenditures outside China when the interview was ended abruptly after Chinese security forces entered his house and seized him. Sun is reported to be locked in currently and two VOA journalists Feng Yibing and Allen Ai were seized for several hours after trying to reach Sun in August 2018.

Writing
His books, published in Hong Kong, include:
 Against the Wind for 33 Years: Dictatorship after 1977 versus Constitutional Democracy
 Essays from Within and Without of Prison
 Calling for Freedom
 A Country in a Century of Trouble: From Mao Zedong to Jiang Zemin
 Essays on Chinese Central Government and CCP from Prison.

References

Chinese dissidents
1934 births
Living people
Shandong University alumni
Academic staff of Shandong University
People from Rongcheng, Shandong
Chinese political writers
Physicists from Shandong
Writers from Weihai
Educators from Shandong